Mashhad Northern Bypass Freeway is a freeway in Mashhad, Razavi Khorasan, Northeastern Iran. It was opened in fall 2012.

References

Transport in Tehran
Freeways in Iran